According to Article 3 of the Constitution of Equatorial Guinea, the country is divided for administrative and economic purposes into regions, provinces, districts, and municipalities. In practice, the provinces serve as the first-level administrative divisions. Municipalities are subdivided into village councils and neighbourhood communities. Many of the sub-municipal entities are grouped into urban districts, which remain subordinate to municipalities and are distinct from districts proper.

Regions
Equatorial Guinea is divided into a continental region known as Río Muni, and an insular region comprising Bioko, Annobón, Corisco, Elobey Grande, Elobey Chico, Conga, Leva, Cocotero and other smaller islets. The islets of Mbañe, Conga, and Cocotero are subject to a territorial dispute with Gabon, pending resolution at the International Court of Justice.

Provinces

Equatorial Guinea is divided into eight provinces (capitals appear in parentheses):

 Annobón (San Antonio de Palé)
 Bioko Norte (Malabo)
 Bioko Sur (Luba)
 Centro Sur (Evinayong)
 Djibloho (Ciudad de la Paz)
 Kié-Ntem (Ebebiyín)
 Litoral (Bata)
 Wele-Nzas (Mongomo)

The provinces are further divided into 19 districts and 37 municipalities.

Districts and municipalities

The 19 districts and 37 municipalities of Equatorial Guinea are organized as shown in the following table. Municipalities that are the capitals of their respective provinces are shown in bold.

Sub-municipal local government
Below the municipalities are further entities of local government, called village councils (consejos de poblados) in rural areas and neighbourhood communities (comunidades de vecinos) in urban areas. According to a 2013 United Nations report, there were 716 village councils and 344 neighbourhood communities in Equatorial Guinea.

Neighbourhood communities in the urban areas of Malabo and Bata are grouped into urban districts (distritos urbanos), five in each city. These urban districts are subordinate to municipalities and are thus different from districts proper which lie above the municipal level of government.

In 2017, Equatorial Guinea created three new urban districts from various village councils and neighbourhood communities in every district proper (including Bata and Malabo, which now have eight urban districts each) except for Annobón and Djibloho, which each saw the creation of two urban districts. Thus there are now a total of 65 urban districts in Equatorial Guinea.

See also

References

 
Equatorial Guinea
Equatorial Guinea